Mount Theseus is a prominent peak, 1,830 m, just south of Clark Glacier in the Olympus Range of Victoria Land. Named by the Victoria University of Wellington Antarctic Expedition (VUWAE) (1958–59) after a figure of Greek mythology.

Mountains of Victoria Land
McMurdo Dry Valleys